Quchayuq Urqu (Quechua qucha lake, -yuq a suffix to indicate ownership, urqu mountain, "the mountain with a lake (or lakes)", also spelled Ccochayocc Orcco) is a mountain in the Andes of Peru, about  high. It is situated in the Ayacucho Region, Víctor Fajardo Province, Sarhua District.

References

Mountains of Peru
Mountains of Ayacucho Region